Cosmosoma advena is a moth of the subfamily Arctiinae. It was described by Herbert Druce in 1884. It is found in Mexico and Guatemala.

References

advena
Moths described in 1884